Parliamentary elections were held in North Vietnam on 6 April 1975. The Vietnamese Fatherland Front won all 424 seats, with voter turnout reported to be 98.26%. They were the final elections held in North Vietnam, as Vietnamese reunification occurred the following year.

Results

References

North Vietnam
Parliamentary election
Elections in North Vietnam
April 1975 events in Asia
Election and referendum articles with incomplete results